Volkswagen currywurst is a brand of sausage manufactured by the Volkswagen car maker since 1973.  It is manufactured at the company's Wolfsburg plant and sold in restaurants in its six German factories.  The currywurst are also sold externally at supermarkets and football stadiums and given away to Volkswagen customers.  The sausage is branded as a "Volkswagen Original Part" and has been given the part number 199 398 500 A.  The product has been described as the most produced of any of Volkswagen's parts, some 6.81 million sausages being manufactured in 2018.  In many recent years the company has produced more sausages than cars.  A Volkswagen ketchup is also produced and sold to accompany the currywurst.

Description
The sausage is manufactured in a part of the Wolfsburg Volkswagen Plant by a team of 30 people.

The sausage is made from pork delivered to the factory three times a week. The pork cuts are trimmed to remove excess fat, which provides a fat content to the sausage of approximately 20%, significantly lower than the 35% usual for a bratwurst sausage. The pork is then ground and mixed with a secret recipe of spices before being inserted into sausage skins branded with Volkswagen Originalteil ("Volkswagen Original Part"). After cooling the sausages are sealed into packs of five.

The sausage has been given an official part number, namely 199 398 500 A. Volkswagen state that their currywurst contains no protein powder, monosodium glutamate or phosphates. A ketchup, the traditional currywurst accompaniment, is also manufactured. The Volkswagen branded ketchup (199 398 500 B) is slightly more viscous than traditional mixes. A pack of sausages and a bottle of ketchup retail for approximately US$10. A wheat-based vegan version is also produced at the factory.

The currywurst is sold in the 17 canteens and restaurants in the Wolfsburg factory, usually with ketchup and chips (French fries). A currywurst soup is also sold. To celebrate the product's 45th anniversary, currywurst burgers and currywurst pizza were produced.

Volkswagen also sells utensils to go with the currywurst. One example is the plate, part number 33D 069 602.

History 

Volkswagen has produced food for its workers at the Wolfsburg plant since it opened in 1938 due to the remote location of the factory. It has produced the currywurst since 1973. Initially, the plant received whole animals from a Volkswagen-owned farm that were butchered on site – this has since ceased and pre-butchered animals are sourced locally. The meat was originally a blend of pork and beef but the beef was removed in the 1990s owing to the United Kingdom BSE outbreak of that decade. The currywurst has won prizes at German food fairs and has received gold awards from the German Agricultural Society. The sausage features in the AutoMuseum Volkswagen and at the Deutsches Currywurst Museum, until it closed in 2018. The vegetarian currywurst was introduced in 2010. In August 2021, VW announced that it was removing the traditional pork-based product from the cafeteria menu at the Wolfsburg plant in favor of the vegetarian version. This move drew fire from former German chancellor Gerhard Schröder.

Around 40% of Volkswagen currywurst production is consumed within restaurants at its six German factories; the remainder is sold at external shops, supermarkets and football stadiums. A portion is also sent to Volkswagen dealerships across Europe which use the currywurst as a present for customers who purchase new cars. Proceeds from external sales are used by Volkswagen to subsidise the price of food in its staff restaurants. The product is sold in 11 countries but is not available in the United States due to its rules on the import of uncooked meat. In the past Volkswagen has sent a team of chefs to the United States to replicate the product with locally sourced ingredients. The company is also looking to export the product to Singapore.

Currywurst production has increased in recent years. In 2015 7.2 million were produced, 14% more than had been manufactured in 2014. Production increased by 264% between 2009 and 2018 when 6.81 million were made, making the currywurst the most produced of any part in the Volkswagen range. In many years Volkswagen has produced more individual currywurst than individual cars, including 2013, 2014, 2015 and 2017.

See also
 List of sausages

References 

Volkswagen Group
German sausages
Products introduced in 1973